John Christopher Daly (12 December 1917 – 10 October 1988) was an Irish rugby union and professional rugby league footballer who played in the 1940s and 1950s. When Jack Daly ran onto the playing field he used to do a double somersault, and before international matches he would do double back-somersaults to confirm his fitness.

Background
John Daly was born in Cobh, County Cork, Ireland, he served as a signaller with the London Irish Rifles in North Africa, and Italy during World War II, he was involved in the Battle of Monte Cassino, and he died aged 70 in Chertsey, Surrey, England.

Playing career

Club career
Daly changed rugby football codes from rugby union to rugby league when he transferred to Huddersfield during 1948. He played left-, i.e. number 8, in Huddersfield's 2-20 defeat by Wigan in the Championship Final during the 1949–50 season at Maine Road, Manchester on Saturday 13 May 1950.

Daly played right-, i.e. number 10, in Huddersfield's 4-11 defeat by Bradford Northern in the 1949–50 Yorkshire County Cup Final during the 1949–50 season at Headingley Rugby Stadium, Leeds on Saturday 29 October 1949.

In September 1951, he transferred from Huddersfield to the Featherstone Rovers, he played right-, i.e. number 10, in the Featherstone Rovers' 12-18 defeat by Workington Town in the 1951–52 Challenge Cup Final during the 1951–52 season at Wembley Stadium, London on Saturday 19 April 1952, in front of a crowd of 72,093.

Representative honours
Daly won caps in rugby union for Ireland in 1947 against France, England, Scotland, and Wales, and in 1948 against England, Scotland, and Wales.

In rugby league, he represented British Empire XIII in 1949 against France, and won caps for Other Nationalities (RL) in 1950 against France (2 matches), in 1951 against Wales, and England, in 1952 against England, and France, and in 1953 against Wales.

Honoured by Rugby League Ireland
On 25 March 2004 footballer were inducted into Rugby League Ireland's inaugural Hall of Fame at the Rugby League Heritage Centre in Huddersfield, they were; John "Jack" Daly (Huddersfield/Featherstone Rovers), Robert "Bob" Kelly (Keighley/Wakefield Trinity/Batley), Seamus McCallion (Halifax/Leeds/Bramley), Thomas "Tom" McKinney, (Salford/Warrington/St. Helens), Terry O'Connor (Salford/Wigan Warriors/Widnes Vikings), Patrick "Paddy" Reid (Huddersfield/Halifax).

References

External links
Profile at london-irish.co.uk

1917 births
1988 deaths
Military personnel from County Cork
Barbarian F.C. players
British Army personnel of World War II
British Empire rugby league team players
Cork Constitution players
Expatriate rugby league players in England
Featherstone Rovers players
Huddersfield Giants players
Ireland international rugby union players
Irish expatriate rugby league players
Irish expatriate sportspeople in England
Irish rugby league players
Irish rugby union players
London Irish players
London Irish Rifles soldiers
Munster Rugby players
Other Nationalities rugby league team players
Rugby league players from County Cork
Rugby league props
Rugby union players from County Cork
Rugby union props